Lester Alvin Burnett (March 18, 1911 – February 16, 1967), better known as Smiley Burnette, was an American country music performer and a comedic actor in Western films and on radio and TV, playing sidekick to Gene Autry, Roy Rogers, and other B-movie cowboys. He was also a prolific singer-songwriter who is reported to have played proficiently over 100 musical instruments, sometimes more than one simultaneously. His career, beginning in 1934, spanned four decades, including a regular role on CBS-TV's Petticoat Junction in the 1960s.

Biography

Lester A. Burnett (he added the final "e" later in life) was born in Summum, Illinois, on March 18, 1911, and grew up in Ravenwood, Missouri. He began singing as a child and learned to play a wide variety of instruments by ear, yet never learned to read or write music. In his teens, he worked in vaudeville, and starting in 1929, at the state's first commercial radio station, WDZ-AM in Tuscola, Illinois.

Burnette came by his nickname while creating a character for a WDZ children's program. He was reading Mark Twain's "The Celebrated Jumping Frog of Calaveras County" at the time, which included a character named Jim Smiley. He named the radio character Mr. Smiley and soon adopted the moniker as his own, dropping the title.

Film career

His break came in December 1933, when he was hired by Gene Autry to play accordion on National Barn Dance on Chicago's WLS-AM, on which Autry was the major star. As sound films became popular, Hollywood sought musical talent for Western films; and in 1934, producer Nat Levine cast Autry and Burnette in their film debut (unbilled) as part of a bluegrass band in Mascot Pictures' In Old Santa Fe starring Ken Maynard. Burnette sang and played accordion, and the film included two of his compositions.

He had other small parts until a secondary, but more prominent role in the 1935 serial The Adventures of Rex and Rinty. That same year, Levine gave Autry his first starring role in the 12-part serial The Phantom Empire, with Burnette playing Oscar, a comic-relief role. Mascot was soon absorbed by Republic Pictures, and Republic enjoyed enormous success with its musical Western features starring Autry. In each of the films, Burnette played Autry's comic sidekick, Frog Millhouse, with his trademark floppy black hat and trick voice (imitating a deep, froglike croak). Their association produced 62 feature-length musical Westerns.

By 1940, Smiley Burnette ranked second only to Autry in a Boxoffice magazine popularity poll of Western stars, the lone sidekick among the top 10 (though offscreen he earned a reputation as being moody and temperamental), and when Autry left for World War II service, Burnette provided a sidekick to Eddie Dew, Sunset Carson, and Bob Livingston and appeared in nine other films with Roy Rogers. Burnette's movie horse, white with a black-ringed left eye, also became famous, first as Black-eyed Nellie, then as Ring-eyed Nellie, and finally as just Ring Eye.

After leaving Republic in June 1944, he became the sidekick to Charles Starrett at Columbia Pictures in the new Durango Kid series. Starrett and Burnette were paired in 56 films, from 1945 to 1952. When Starrett retired, Burnette was still under contract, so Columbia teamed him with Jock Mahoney for a new series of Westerns. A pilot film with Mahoney and Burnette was completed, but never released; Columbia then reassigned Burnette to its Gene Autry series, reuniting Burnette with his former partner.

Singer-songwriter

Smiley Burnette wrote more than 400 songs and sang a significant number of them on screen. His Western classic, "Ridin' Down the Canyon (To Watch the Sun Go Down)", was later recorded by Willie Nelson, Riders in the Sky, and Johnnie Lee Wills. Other compositions included "On the Strings of My Lonesome Guitar" (Jimmy Wakely's theme song in the 1940s), "Fetch Me Down My Trusty .45", "Ridin' All Day", and "It's Indian Summer" as well as "The Wind Sings a Cowboy Song," "The Old Covered Wagon," and "Western Lullaby." He also composed musical scores for such films as The Painted Stallion and Waterfront Lady. His songs were recorded by a wide range of singers, including Bing Crosby, Ferlin Husky, and Leon Russell. His performance of "Steamboat Bill" appeared on Billboard's country chart in 1939.

Inventor

Burnette devised and built some of his unusual musical instruments in his home workshop. His "Jassackaphone", for example, which he played in the film The Singing Cowboy, resembled an organ with pipes, levers, and pull mechanisms.

In the 1940s, he invented and patented an early home audiovisual system called Cinevision Talkies. Each package contained a 78 rpm record with four of his songs and 15 35 mm slides. The slides were to be projected in order and advanced each time a short tone played on the record during the songs. An inside cover of the record album was white so those with no projector and screen could simply shine a flashlight through the slides and view them on the cover. He also devised more than a dozen clever uses for a common wire clothes hanger and demonstrated several of them during a TV show guest appearance.

Publicity and promotion

Hollywood stars usually left their publicity and promotion to the studios that employed them, but Smiley Burnette took charge of his promotion personally. He was highly aware of his box-office value and shrewdly merchandised his name and likeness. He organized a national Smiley Burnette Fan Club, aimed mostly at the juvenile audience, and sold autographed photos and souvenirs to club members. He made additional money by making personal appearances at theaters showing his films. Burnette's base of operations was Springfield, Missouri, where he produced and hosted a nationally syndicated 15-minute radio program, The Smiley Burnette Show, through RadiOzark Enterprises. He also made regular appearances on ABC-TV's Ozark Jubilee from Springfield.

Gene Autry retired from motion pictures in 1953, and other cowboy stars had either left the movies or were winding down their screen careers. With the studios no longer interested in making B Westerns, Burnette turned to broadcasting and made guest appearances on many country music radio and TV shows, including Louisiana Hayride, the Grand Ole Opry, and Ranch Party.

In early 1957, when quiz shows were popular, he filmed a pilot for a proposed ABC-TV series to originate from Springfield called Pig 'N Poke, a quiz show with a country theme, although ABC did not buy the show.

Burnette enjoyed cooking, and in the 1950s, he opened a restaurant chain called The Checkered Shirt, the first of the A-frame drive-ins. The first location was in Orlando, Florida, and two locations still exist in California (Redding and Escondido), though they are no longer owned by the Burnette family.

As the 1960s began, Burnette continued to make personal appearances at drive-ins, fairs, hospitals, town squares, and rodeos. Among other venues, he once appeared with Dewey Brown and the Oklahoma Playboys at a Friday-night dance at Jump's Roller Rink in Fairfax, Oklahoma.

In the mid 1960s, he portrayed railway engineer Charley Pratt on the CBS-TV programs Petticoat Junction (106 episodes) and Green Acres (seven episodes).

Death

Just after filming wrapped for the fourth season of Petticoat Junction, Burnette became ill. On February 16, 1967, a month before his 56th birthday, he died in Encino, California, from leukemia and was interred in Forest Lawn Memorial Park in Hollywood Hills, California.

Legacy

Burnette donated his original hat and shirt to the Cowboy Hall of Fame in Oklahoma City, Oklahoma, in 1962. In 1971, he was inducted posthumously into the Nashville Songwriters Hall of Fame.

For his contributions to the film industry, Burnette was inducted posthumously into the Hollywood Walk of Fame in 1986 with a motion pictures star located at 6125 Hollywood Boulevard. In 1998, he was inducted into the Western Music Association. On May 5, 2012, he was inducted into the Cowtown Society of Western Music Hall of Fame as a Hero.

Burnette is mentioned in the Statler Brothers' 1973 country music hit "Whatever Happened to Randolph Scott?" (later the title of a 1994 Scott biography), which reached number 22  on the country chart.

Selected filmography

In Old Santa Fe (1934) as Lester Burnette (uncredited)
The Marines Are Coming (1934) as Sailor Delivering Flowers to Bill (uncredited)
Mystery Mountain (1934, Serial) as Lake Teamster [Ch. 6-7] (uncredited)
Arizona Bad Man (1935) as Credits Singer (uncredited)
The Phantom Empire (1935, Serial) as Oscar
Lightning Triggers (1935) as Singer Over Opening Credits (uncredited)
The Adventures of Rex and Rinty (1935, Serial) as Jensen
Tumbling Tumbleweeds (1935) as Smiley
Harmony Lane (1935) as Singer (uncredited)
Waterfront Lady (1935) as Musician
Melody Trail (1935) as Frog Millhouse
The Sagebrush Troubadour (1935) as Frog Millhouse
The Singing Vagabond (1935) as Frog Millhouse
Hitch Hike Lady (1935) as Singer (uncredited)
The Cheyenne Tornado (1935) as Singer Over Credits (uncredited)
Red River Valley (1936) as Frog
Doughnuts and Society (1936) as Mover #2
Comin' Round the Mountain (1936) as Frog Millhouse
The Singing Cowboy (1936) as Frog Millhouse
Hearts in Bondage (1936) as Rammer (uncredited)
Undersea Kingdom (1936) as Briny Deep
The Border Patrolman (1936) as Chuck Owens
Guns and Guitars (1936) as Frog Millhouse
Oh, Susanna! (1936) as Frog Millhouse
Ride, Ranger, Ride (1936) as Frog Millhouse
The Big Show (1936) as Frog Millhouse
The Old Corral (1936) as Frog Millhouse
A Man Betrayed (1936) as Hillbilly
Larceny on the Air (1937) as Jimmy
Dick Tracy (1937, Serial) as Mike McGurk
Round-Up Time in Texas (1937) as Frog Millhouse
Git Along Little Dogies (1937) as Frog Millhouse
Rootin' Tootin' Rhythm (1937) as Frog Milhouse
Yodelin' Kid from Pine Ridge (1937) as Colonel Frog Millhouse
Meet the Boyfriend (1937) as Band Leader
Public Cowboy No. 1 (1937) as Frog Millhouse
Boots and Saddles (1937) as Frog Millhouse
Springtime in the Rockies (1937) as Frog Millhouse
Manhattan Merry-Go-Round (1937) as Frog - Accordion Player
The Old Barn Dance (1936) as Frog Millhouse
Hollywood Stadium Mystery (1938) as himself
Under Western Stars (1938) as Frog Millhouse
Gold Mine in the Sky (1938) as Frog Millhouse
The Man from Music Mountain (1938) as Frog Millhouse
Billy the Kid Returns (1938) as Frog Millhouse
Prairie Moon (1938) as Frog Millhouse
Rhythm of the Saddle (1938) as Frog Millhouse
Western Jamboree (1938) as Frog Millhouse
Home on the Prairie (1939) as Frog Millhouse
Mexicali Rose (1939) as Frog Millhouse
Blue Montana Skies (1939) as Frog Millhouse
Mountain Rhythm (1939) as Frog Millhouse
Colorado Sunset (1939) as Frog Millhouse
In Old Monterey (1939) as Frog Millhouse
Rovin' Tumbleweeds (1939) as Frog Millhouse
South of the Border (1939) as Frog Millhouse
Rancho Grande (1940) as Frog Millhouse
Gaucho Serenade (1940) as Frog Millhouse
Carolina Moon (1940) as Frog Millhouse
Ride, Tenderfoot, Ride (1940) as Frog Millhouse
Ridin' on a Rainbow (1941) as Frog Millhouse
Back in the Saddle (1941) as Frog Millhouse
The Singing Hill (1941) as Frog Millhouse
Sunset in Wyoming (1941) as Frog Millhouse
Under Fiesta Stars (1941) as Frog Millhouse
Down Mexico Way (1941) as Frog Millhouse
Sierra Sue (1941) as Frog Millhouse
Cowboy Serenade (1942) as Frog Millhouse
Heart of the Rio Grande (1942) as Frog Millhouse
Home in Wyomin' (1942) as Frog Millhouse
Stardust on the Sage (1942) as Frog Millhouse
Call of the Canyon (1942) as Frog Millhouse
Bells of Capistrano (1942) as Frog Millhouse
Heart of the Golden West (1942) as Frog Millhouse
Idaho (1943) as Frog Millhouse
King of the Cowboys (1943) as Frog Millhouse
Silver Spurs (1943) as Frog Millhouse
Beyond the Last Frontier (1943) as Frog Millhouse
Raiders of Sunset Pass (1943) as Frog Millhouse
Pride of the Plains (1944) as Frog Millhouse
Beneath Western Skies (1944) as Sheriff Frog Millhouse
The Laramie Trail (1944) as Frog Millhouse
Call of the Rockies (1944) as Frog Millhouse
Bordertown Trail (1944) as Frog Millhouse
Code of the Prairie (1944) as Frog Millhouse
Firebrands of Arizona (1944) as Frog Millhouse / Beefsteak Discoe
Roaring Rangers (1946) as himself
Gunning for Vengeance (1946) as himself
Galloping Thunder (1946) as himself
Two-Fisted Stranger (1946) as Deputy
The Desert Horseman (1946) as himself
Heading West (1946) as himself
Landrush (1946) as himself
 Terror Trail (1946) as himself
The Fighting Frontiersman (1946) as himself
South of the Chisholm Trail (1947) as himself
The Lone Hand Texan (1947) as himself
West of Dodge City (1947) as himself, editor
Law of the Canyon (1947) as himself
Prairie Raiders (1947) as himself
The Stranger from Ponca City (1947) as himself
Riders of the Lone Star (1947) as himself
Buckaroo from Powder River (1947) as himself
Last Days of Boot Hill (1947) as Deputy
Six-Gun Law (1948) as himself
Phantom Valley (1948) as himself
West of Sonora (1948) as himself
Whirlwind Raiders (1948) as himself
Blazing Across the Pecos (1948) as Marshall
Trail to Laredo (1948) as himself
El Dorado Pass (1948) as himself
Quick on the Trigger (1948) as himself
Challenge of the Range (1949) as himself
Desert Vigilante (1949) as himself
Laramie (1949) as himself
The Blazing Trail (1949) as Marshall
South of Death Valley (1949) as himself
Bandits of El Dorado (1949) as Sheriff
Horsemen of the Sierras (1949) as himself
Renegades of the Sage (1949) as himself
Trail of the Rustlers (1950) as himself
Outcast of Black Mesa (1950) as himself
Texas Dynamo (1950) as himself
Streets of Ghost Town (1950) as himself
Across the Badlands (1950) as himself
Raiders of Tomahawk Creek (1950) as himself
Frontier Outpost (1950) as himself
Lightning Guns (1950) as himself
Prairie Roundup (1951) as himself
Ridin' the Outlaw Trail (1951) as himself
Fort Savage Raiders (1951) as himself
Whirlwind (1951) as himself
Snake River Desperadoes (1951) as himself
Bonanza Town (1951) as himself
Cyclone Fury (1951) as himself
The Kid from Amarillo (1951) as himself
Pecos River (1951) as himself
Smoky Canyon (1952) as himself
The Hawk of Wild River (1952) as himself
Laramie Mountains (1952) as Sergeant Smiley Burnette
The Rough, Tough West (1952) as Fire Chief
Junction City (1952) as himself
The Kid from Broken Gun (1952) as himself
Winning of the West (1953) as himself
On Top of Old Smoky (1953) as himself
Goldtown Ghost Riders (1953) as himself
Pack Train (1953) as himself
Saginaw Trail (1953) as himself
Last of the Pony Riders (1953) as himself

References

Further reading
Billings, Jim "Comes Long Way From Dwarf Role," (January 20, 1957), Springfield News & Leader

External links

Smiley Burnette's official Web site
Smiley Burnette in the Nashville Songwriters Hall of Fame
Smiley Burnette in the Western Music Association
Smiley Burnette tribute Web site
Smiley Burnette biography

Obituary at Obituaries Today

1911 births
1967 deaths
American country singer-songwriters
American male film actors
American male singer-songwriters
Singer-songwriters from Illinois
American multi-instrumentalists
Deaths from leukemia
People from Fulton County, Illinois
Vaudeville performers
Male Western (genre) film actors
Abbott Records artists
Starday Records artists
Deaths from cancer in California
Burials at Forest Lawn Memorial Park (Hollywood Hills)
20th-century American male actors
20th-century American singers
People from Nodaway County, Missouri
Country musicians from Illinois
Country musicians from Missouri
20th-century American male singers
Singer-songwriters from Missouri